Langeweide is a hamlet in the Dutch province of South Holland. It is a part of the former municipality of Reeuwijk, and lies about 6 km east of Gouda.

References

Bodegraven-Reeuwijk
Populated places in South Holland